A Gudiña is a municipality in Ourense in the Galicia region of north-west Spain. It is located to the very south-east of the province.

References  

Municipalities in the Province of Ourense